McAnea is a surname. Notable people with the surname include: 

Christina McAnea (born 1958), British trade union leader
Thomas McAnea (1950–2013), Scottish counterfeiter